Dianella revoluta, commonly known as blueberry lily, blue flax-lily, or black-anther flax-lily, a species of flowering plant in the family Asphodelaceae and is endemic to, and widespread in Australia. It is a tufted, perennial herb with grass-like leaves and up to nine blue or violet flowers with six tepals, and stamens with bright yellow filaments and pale brown to almost black anthers.

Description

Taxonomy
Dianella revoluta was first formally described in 1810 by Robert Brown in his Prodromus Florae Novae Hollandiae et Insulae Van Diemen.

Five varieties of D. revoluta are accepted by the Australian Plant Census:
 Dianella revoluta var. divaricata (R.Br.) R.J.F.Henderson;
 Dianella revoluta var. minor R.J.F.Henderson;
 Dianella revoluta R.Br. var. revoluta R.J.F.Henderson;
 Dianella revoluta var. tenuis R.J.F.Henderson;
 Dianella revoluta var. vinosa R.J.F.Henderson.

Distribution and habitat
Blueberry lily is common and widespread in all Australian states and the Australian Capital Territory but not the Northern Territory, growing in a wide range of habitats apart from very wet and very dry habitats.

Uses
The berry of D. revoluta is reported to be edible.

Cultural use
Dianella, Western Australia was named after this plant, which was plentiful in the area prior to the 1960s residential development.

References

revoluta
Asparagales of Australia
Flora of New South Wales
Flora of Western Australia
Flora of South Australia
Flora of Queensland
Flora of the Australian Capital Territory
Flora of Tasmania
Flora of Victoria (Australia)
Plants described in 1810
Taxa named by Robert Brown (botanist, born 1773)